Nile Pilot was an English-language daily newspaper published from Khartoum, Sudan. The newspaper was founded in 1965. It was linked to Sadiq wing of the Umma Party.

References

Defunct newspapers published in Sudan
English-language newspapers published in Africa
1965 establishments in Sudan
Newspapers established in 1965